System Activity Report (sar) is a Unix System V-derived system monitor command used to report on various system loads, including CPU activity, memory/paging, interrupts, device load, network and swap space utilization. Sar uses /proc filesystem for gathering information.

Platform support 
Sar was originally developed for Solaris operating system and it is available in Linux, Solaris, AIX, HP-UX, but it is not available for macOS or FreeBSD. Prior to 2013 there was a bsdsar tool, but it is now deprecated.

Linux distributions, such as Debian, Red Hat Enterprise Linux, SuSe and Ubuntu provide sar utility through the sysstat package.

Syntax 
 sar [-flags] [ -e time ] [ -f filename ] [-i sec ] [ -s time ]
   filename Uses filename as the data source for sar. The default is the current daily data file /var/adm/sa/sadd.
   time Selects data up to time. The default is 18:00.
   sec Selects data at intervals as close as possible to sec seconds.

Example 
[user@localhost]$ sar  # Displays current CPU activity.

Sysstat package 
Additional to sar command, Linux sysstat package in Debian, RedHat Enterprise Linux and SuSE provides additional reporting tools:

See also 
 atopsar
 Nmon
 sag - "system activity graph" command
 ksar-  BSD licensed Java-based application to create graph of all parameters from the data collected by Unix sar utilities.
 CURT, IBM AIX CPU Usage Reporting Tool
 isag, tcl based command to plot sar/sysstat data

References 

Easy system monitoring with SAR (IBM developerWorks)
System Activity Reporter (Softpanorama)
Article on sar at Computerhope

Footnotes 

Job scheduling
Computer performance
System administration